Below are the squads for the Football at the 2017 Southeast Asian Games - men's tournament, hosted by Malaysia, which took place between 14 and 29 August 2017.

Group A

Manager: Ong Kim Swee

Manager:  Gerd Zeise

Manager:  Richard Tardy

Manager:  Dave Booth

Manager:  Kwon Oh-son

Group B

Manager: Worrawoot Srimaka

Manager: Nguyễn Hữu Thắng

Manager:  Luis Milla

Manager:  Leonardo Vitorino

Manager: Marlon Maro

Manager:  Kim Shin-hwan

References 

Men's team squads